Bucculatrix hypocypha is a moth in the family Bucculatricidae. It was described in 1936 by Edward Meyrick. It is found in Taiwan.

References

Natural History Museum Lepidoptera generic names catalog

Bucculatricidae
Moths described in 1936
Taxa named by Edward Meyrick
Moths of Asia